Agnidra scabiosa is a moth in the family Drepanidae. It was described by Arthur Gardiner Butler in 1877. It is found in south-eastern Russia, Korea, Japan and China.

The wingspan is 14-17.5 mm for males and 17.5–20 mm for females. Adults are similar to Agnidra fuscilinea, but have a distinctive colour pattern of the wings.

The larvae feed on Quercus and Castanea species.

Subspecies
Agnidra scabiosa scabiosa (Japan, south-eastern Russia)
Agnidra scabiosa fixseni (Bryk, 1949) (Korea, China: Manchuria, Chekian, Hunan, Hupeh, Kiangsu)

References

Moths described in 1877
Drepaninae
Moths of Asia